Amy Gamble (born December 17, 1964) is an American former handball player. She competed in the women's tournament at the 1988 Summer Olympics.

References

External links
 

1964 births
Living people
American female handball players
Olympic handball players of the United States
Handball players at the 1988 Summer Olympics
Sportspeople from Wheeling, West Virginia
21st-century American women
Medalists at the 1987 Pan American Games
Pan American Games gold medalists for the United States
Pan American Games medalists in handball